Nordkraft  is a 2002 Danish novel by Jakob Ejersbo. It is mainly set in Aalborg in the early 1990s and is about Maria (who is confused and unable to leave her drug-dealer boyfriend Asger), Allan (who is trying to put his dubious past behind him) and Steso-Thomas. The three main characters find themselves in a dependent but enthusiastic dance with drugs as they constantly search for eternal intoxication. 

The book sold more than 100,000 copies, an unusually high sales figure on the book market in Denmark. The novel is inspired by the 1996 film Portland and was adapted for film itself in 2005.

Sources

https://web.archive.org/web/20080817040909/http://www.litteratursiden.dk/sw5737.asp

2002 Danish novels
Danish-language novels